The Battle of Ichogil Bund also known as the Battle of BRB Canal was a skirmish fought from 22 September to 23 September 1965 as part of the Indo-Pakistani War of 1965 in which approximately two Pakistani companies attempted to re-occupy the eastern bund of the Ichhogil Canal. However, the Pakistani forces were routed, resulting in an Indian victory, and the contested section of the canal was re-captured by the 9th Battalion Madras Regiment, under the command of Lieutenant Colonel B.K. Satyan.

The battle was notable for being fought after the cease-fire had been signed on September 22. Fighting began around midnight and lasted for about 2 and a half hours. Accounts differ: between 27 and 49 Indian soldiers died. Pakistani casualties included 48 dead, 11 captured and 80 jumped into the canal and were washed away (presumably dead).

The Ichogil Canal was constructed by the Pakistanis in the 1950s partly as a defensive obstacle to prevent an invasion of Lahore. Much of the battle was fought from across the canal, with tanks providing fire support to a ground team which had crossed the canal.

See also
Battle of Asal Uttar
Battle of Chawinda
Khemkaran

References

Indo-Pakistani War of 1965
Battles of Indo-Pakistani wars